Mezhdu denya i noshtta (pronounced ) is the first video release by Balkandji. It contains four video clips by the band and a recording of their performance on the 2003 festival "Slantse/Luna" in Trigrad. It also contains an information about the band members, a gallery of pictures and an interview with the band. The interview and the information are in Bulgarian.

The name in English means "Between day and night".

It is freely distributed under the Creative Commons Attribution Licence.

Track listing

Video clips
 Krali Marko
 Az tebe, libe, sum zaljubil
 Oy, mari, Yano!
 Zvezdica

"Slantse/Luna" performance
 Libe
 Oy, mari, Yano!
 Pogled
 Burya
 Kam taz zemya
 Narod

Notes

  DVD download.

Balkandji albums
2006 video albums